Raiganj is an upazila of Sirajganj District in the Rajshahi Division of Bangladesh.

Geography
About 65% of the total land of the upazila belongs to flood-prone areas and the remaining 35% belongs to the Varendra region. It is bounded by Sherpur and Dhunat upazilas (Bogura) on the north, Ullahpara and Kamarkhanda on the south, Tarash on the west and Sirajganj Sadar on the east.

Etymology
Raiganj is a Bengali language compound of two words; Rai, a title of nobility, and Ganj meaning marketplace/neighbourhood. There are numerous theories as to how the area got its name, with the popular theory being that it was named after Shreeman Haridas Guha Rai Thakur, an influential Zamindar in the area. Other historians suggest that the area was named after the Rai Bahadurs of Tarash who founded a marketplace in present-day Raiganj.

History
In the 10th century, this area was a part of the Pala Empire. Emperor Gopala II (r. 940-960) dug a 174 bigha lake known as Jaysagar, located 1 km west of the Nimgachhi Bazar in Sonakhara Union. This lake was famed across North Bengal and served to alleviate the water shortages of the locals and cattle. During the Mughal period, a three-domed mosque was constructed in present-day Dhangara.

On 27 January 1922, hundreds of people were killed in Salanga when the British colonial authorities indiscriminately opened fire on a rally led by Abdur Rashid Tarkabagish as part of the Swadeshi movement.  
A mass graveyard remains near Salanga Bazar, and the event is annually commemorated on 27 January in Bangladesh as Salanga Day.  
Raiganj Thana was formed in 1937.

During the Bangladesh Liberation War of 1971, the areas of Chandaikona Bazar, Pangashi, Salanga and Dhangara were plundered and its inhabitants were mass killed with many houses set on fire. Raiganj was liberated on 12 December. Raiganj Thana was turned into an upazila in 1984.

Administration
Raiganj Upazila is divided into Raiganj Municipality and nine union parishads: Brommogacha, Chandaikona, Dhamainagar, Dhangara, Dhubil, Ghurka, Nalka, Pangashi, and Sonakhara. The union parishads are subdivided into 187 mauzas and 267 villages.

Raiganj Municipality is subdivided into 9 wards and 29 mahallas.

Education

There are nine colleges in the upazila: Begum Nurnnahar Tarkabagish Honurs College, Dadpur G.R. College, Fuljore Degree College, Gram Pangashi College, Hazi Wahed Maryam Degree College, Nimgachi Degree College, Raiganj Upazila  Sadar Dhangara Mohila College, Salanga Degree College, and Salanga Womens College.

According to Banglapedia, Chandaikona M. L. High School, founded in 1921, Dhangara High School (1950),Charpara High School(1995) and J. K. A. Mannan High School (1973) are notable secondary schools. In 1976, the Dhangara Fazil Madrasa was established.

Economy and tourism

Raiganj Upazila has many relics and a strong archaeological heritage. Home to over 360 mosques, some notable ones include the Kharija Ghughat Mosque and Majumbarir Masjid. Majumbarir Masjid is a three-domed mosque in Dhangara dating back to the Mughal period. It is in a forested abandoned condition. The mazar of Bhola Dewan and the Birat Raja Palace in Nimgachhi are also popular attractions. The 174 bigha 10th-century Jaysagar reservoir is famed across North Bengal and is 1 km west of the Nimgachhi Bazar in Sonakhara Union.

Main sources of income: Agriculture 69.27%, non-agricultural laborer 2.93%, industry 4.46%, commerce 11.25%, transport and communication 2.51%, service 3.90%, construction 0.90%, religious service 0.17%, rent and remittance 0.18% and others 5.33%

Ownership of agricultural land: Landowner 55.99%, landless 44.01%; agricultural landowner: urban 35.59% and rural 56.49%.

Main crops: Paddy, jute, potato, sugarcane, wheat, pulse, vegetables and fruits Mango, jack-fruit, litchi, banana, papaya, guava, blackberry.

Fisheries, dairies and poultices: Fishery 38, dairy 8, poultry 28, hatchery 5.

There are also many factories like rice mill, flour mill, ice factory, saw mill, welding factory.

See also
 Upazilas of Bangladesh
 Districts of Bangladesh
 Divisions of Bangladesh

References

Upazilas of Sirajganj District